The Belle Meade Apartments is a historic building in Belle Meade, Tennessee near Nashville.

Location
The building is located at 715 Belle Meade Boulevard in Belle Meade, a city near Nashville, Tennessee. It stands opposite the Belle Meade Country Club.

History
The three-storey building was completed in 1917. It was built with investment from Albert Sidney Britt and Herbert H. Corson, two Nashville businessmen and early promoters of the new community of Belle Meade. Prominent tenants included William Jackson Elliston and James Cowdon Bradford Sr. (the founder of J.C. Bradford & Co.), Charles Davitt and Joseph Toy Howell, Sr. (then the president of the Cumberland Valley National Bank).

In 1919, Herbert H. Corson purchased the building. After his death, it was inherited by his descendants.  The City of Belle Meade was subsequently incorporated to ensure, by the enactment of zoning ordinances, that there would be no further apartment or other commercial development within the vicinity.

Architectural significance
The building was designed in the Tudor Revival architectural style by architect Edwin Dougherty. It has been listed on the National Register of Historic Places since April 19, 1984.

References

Residential buildings completed in 1917
Residential buildings on the National Register of Historic Places in Tennessee
Tudor Revival architecture in Tennessee
Buildings and structures in Belle Meade, Tennessee
National Register of Historic Places in Davidson County, Tennessee